The year 1887 in archaeology involved some significant events.

Explorations

Excavations
 June–July - Carl Humann works at Hierapolis.

Finds
 A local woman digging for sebakh at Amarna uncovers a cache of over 300 cuneiform tablets containing diplomatic correspondence of the Pharaohs, now commonly known as the Amarna Letters.
 German submersible Brandtaucher, which sank on trial in the port of Kiel in 1851, is discovered, and on July 5 is raised.

Publications
 William Ivison Macadam - "Notes on the Ancient Iron Industry of Scotland", Proceedings of the Society of Antiquaries of Scotland.
 Augustus Pitt Rivers - Excavations in Cranborne Chase, vol. 1

Events

Miscellaneous
 The Reverend George Brown is elected to the Disney Professorship of Archaeology in the University of Cambridge.

Births
 January 27 - Carl Blegen, American archaeologist of Greece (d. 1971)
 October 27 - Neil Judd, American archaeologist (d. 1976)

Deaths
 September 1 - Jules Desnoyers, French geologist and archaeologist (b. 1800)

References

Archaeology
Archaeology by year
Archaeology
Archaeology